Prasophyllum pruinosum, commonly known as the plum leek orchid, is a species of orchid endemic to South Australia. It has a single tubular leaf and up to twenty green, brown and whitish flowers with a pink of purple tints.

Description
The flowers are yellowish-green, brown, purple-plum and white and are lightly scented. As with others in the genus, the flowers are inverted so that the labellum is above the column rather than below it. There is a brownish callus in the centre of the labellum, reaching almost to its tip. Flowering occurs from September to November.

Taxonomy and naming
Prasophyllum pruinosum was first formally described in 1909 by Richard Sanders Rogers and the description was published in Transactions, proceedings and report, Royal Society of South Australia. The specific epithet (pruinosum) is a Latin word meaning "frosty".

Distribution and habitat
The plum leek orchid grows in woodland and grassy forest in the Black Hill Conservation Park and near Rowland Flat, although its range was once more extensive.

Conservation
Prasophyllum pruinosum is listed as "Endangered" under the Commonwealth Government Environment Protection and Biodiversity Conservation Act 1999 (EPBC) Act and as "Vulnerable" under the South Australian National Parks and Wildlife Act 1972. In 2008 the total population was estimated to be 280 plants in eight sites. The main threats to the population are competition from weeds, grazing by kangaroos, rabbits and livestock and by recreational activities.

References

External links 
 

pruinosum
Flora of South Australia
Endemic orchids of Australia
Plants described in 1909